Hypericum tetrapetalum, the fourpetal St. Johnswort, is a species of flowering plant in the St. John's wort family, Hypericaceae. It is found in the Southeastern United States and Cuba. It was first described by Jean-Baptiste Lamarck in 1797.

Description

Young stems are two- or four-lined, becoming two-lined or terete as they age. The terminal flowerheads produce one to three flowers, each flower  in diameter with 4 bright yellow petals and about 100 stamens. It produces flowers throughout most of the year. The capsules are three-parted.

It is distinguished from the closely related Hypericum crux-andreae by its broader leaves with clasping bases. Their distribution overlaps in southern Georgia and northern Florida, but apparent hybrids have not been observed.

Distribution and habitat
In the United States, H. tetrapetalum is found in Alabama, Georgia, and Florida. It is also found in western Cuba.

H. tetrapetalum occurs in wet pinelands and ditches in sandy soil.

References

tetrapetalum
Plants described in 1797
Flora of Alabama
Flora of Florida
Flora of Georgia (U.S. state)
Flora of Cuba
Taxa named by Jean-Baptiste Lamarck
Flora without expected TNC conservation status